The return to order (French: retour à l'ordre) was a European art movement that followed the First World War, rejecting the extreme avant-garde art of the years up to 1918 and taking its inspiration from classical art instead. The movement was a reaction to the war. Cubism was partially abandoned even by its co-creator Picasso. Futurism, which had praised machinery, dynamism, violence and war, was rejected by most of its adherents. The return to order was associated with a revival of classicism and realistic painting. Though classicism had underpinned the fabric of most paintings for the short time it existed, traces of modernist ideals were still extant in the works of many artists, most notably Picasso and to a greater degree Georges Braque, who continued to delineate forms within a recognizable framework.

This change of direction was reflected and encouraged by the magazine Valori plastici published in Italian and French from 1918 to 1922.  The term return to order to describe this renewed interest in tradition is said to derive from Le rappel à l'ordre, a book of essays by the poet and artist Jean Cocteau published in 1926.

Notable artists 
 Pablo Picasso
 Andre Derain
 Georges Braque
 Salvador Dalí
 Giorgio de Chirico

Gallery

See also

 Corrente di Vita
 Novecento Italiano
 Scuola Romana
 Crystal Cubism

References
 Tate Gallery
 International Herald Tribune

20th century in art
Neoclassical movements